HMS G1 was a British G-class submarine built for the Royal Navy during World War I.

Description
The G-class submarines were designed by the Admiralty in response to a rumour that the Germans were building double-hulled submarines for overseas duties. They displaced  on the surface and  submerged. The G-class submarines had a crew of 30 officers and ratings. They had a partial double hull.

For surface running, the boats were powered by two  Vickers two-stroke eight cylinder diesel engines, each driving one propeller shaft. When submerged each propeller was driven by a  electric motor. They could reach  on the surface and  underwater.

The boats were intended to be armed with one 21-inch (53.3 cm) torpedo tube in the bow and two 18-inch (45 cm) torpedo tubes on the beam. This was revised, however, while they were under construction, the 21-inch tube was moved to the stern and two additional 18-inch tubes were added in the bow. They carried two 21-inch and eight 18-inch torpedoes. The G-class submarines were also armed with a single  deck gun.

Career
Like the rest of her class, G1s role was to patrol an area of the North Sea in search of German U-boats. She survived the war and was sold for scrap in 1920.

Notes

References
 
 
 

 

British G-class submarines
World War I submarines of the United Kingdom
Ships built in Chatham
Royal Navy ship names
1915 ships